Sir Richard Neave, 1st Baronet (22 November 1731 – 28 January 1814) was a British merchant and a Governor of the Bank of England.

Life
Neave was the son of James Neave and Susanna Trueman. He developed considerable interests in the West Indies and the Americas and was chairman at various times of the Ramsgate Harbour Trust, the Society of West Indian Merchants and the London Dock Company, as well as a director of the Hudson's Bay Company. Neave was a friend of George Read of Delaware who wrote to warn him in 1765 that the British government's attempts to tax the colonies without giving them direct representation in Parliament would lead to independence.

Neave lived in Bower House in Havering-atte-Bower but sought to elevate himself from merchant to country gentleman and purchased Dagnam Park in 1772. Neave had the original Dagnams demolished, probably between 1772 and 1776 and replaced by a red-brick Georgian house nine bays wide by four deep with a curved, central three-bay projection to the south front. 

He was a director of the Bank of England for 48 years, made Deputy Governor in 1781 and Governor from 1783 to 1785. Neave's tenure as Governor occurred during the end of the Bengal bubble crash (1769–1784). In 1794, he was appointed High Sheriff of Essex. He was a Fellow of the Society of Antiquaries of London and, in 1785, was elected a Fellow of the Royal Society. He was created a baronet on 13 May 1795.

Family
Neave married Frances Bristow, daughter of John Bristow, MP and merchant, in 1761. He and his wife were painted, in a double portrait, by Thomas Gainsborough around 1765 (private collection). Their daughter Frances married Governor of the Bank of England Beeston Long; in 1806, both Neave and Long served as vice-presidents of the London Institution.

The second daughter Catherine Mary married the antiquarian Henry Howard.

Their third daughter, Caroline Mary Neave, born 23 March 1781, never married but devoted her considerable energies and ability to the improving the treatment of women and children in prisons, refuges and convict ships. She died on 7 December 1861.

References

1731 births
1814 deaths
West Indies merchants
Baronets in the Baronetage of Great Britain
Governors of the Bank of England
High Sheriffs of Essex
Fellows of the Royal Society
Deputy Governors of the Bank of England
Place of birth missing